Ed Gorman is the name of:
Edwin Gorman (1892–1963), Canadian hockey player
Ed Gorman (writer) (1941–2016), writer